Shaul HaKohen Kohen (born in Djerba, Tunisia – died 1848, also in Djerba) was a Mizrahi Jewish rabbi, and writer of multiple rabbinic literary works.

Lineage

In the introduction to his work, the Rabbi provided a detailed lineage going back over a dozen generations of kohanim born at Djerba,

Son of Mussa Kohen בן מוסא כהן, 
Son of Bachtuth Kohen בן בכתות כהן, 
Son of Michael Kohen בן מיכאל כהן, 
Son of Pinchas Kohen בן פינחס כהן, 
Son of Bagdidi Kohen בן בגדידי כהן,
Son of Burathi Kohen בן בוראתי כהן, 
Son of Tamam Kohen בן תמאם כהן, 
Son of Amram Kohen בן עמרם כהן, 
Son of Mevurach Kohen בן מבורך כהן, 
Son of Shlomo Kohen בן שלמה כהן, 
Son of Bagdid Kohen בן בגדיד כהן,
Son of Kalfa Kohen בן כלפא כהן, 
Son of Sayeed Kohen בן סעייד כהן, 
Son of Pinchas Kohen בן פינחס כהן,
Son of Avraham Kohen בן אברהם כהן, 
Son of Moshe Kohen בן משה כהן, 
Son of Shlomo Kohen בן שלמה כהן, 
Son of Peretz Kohen בן פרץ כהן,
Son of Mussa Kohen בן מוסא כהן, 
Son of Shaul Kohen בן שאול כהן, 
Son of Yisrael Kohen בן ישראל כהן, 
Son of Bagdid Kohen בן בגדיד כהן, 
Son of Chizkiya Kohen בן חזקיה כהן, 
Son of Matathya Kohen בן מתתיה כהן,
Son of Yitzchak HaKohen "the elder, the exilee".
From this point onward, the manuscript traces back to Ezra HaSofer, yet the handwriting was found to be illegible.

Burial in Israel
Some 150 years after his passing, the Rabbi was exhumed from his burial place in Djerba, and buried in Israel.

Bibliography
Lechem HaBikurim (p. Livorno, 1870)
Yad Shaul (p. Djerba, 1916) 
Binah Le'Itim)

See also
El Ghriba synagogue

References

19th-century Tunisian rabbis
Kohanim writers of Rabbinic literature
Year of birth uncertain
Jewish grammarians
Linguists of Hebrew
Grammarians of Hebrew
People from Tunis
1848 deaths
Tunisian theologians